The  schinia moth (Schinia siren) is a moth of the family Noctuidae. It is found in North America, including Arizona, Colorado, Kansas, Nebraska, New Mexico, Oklahoma, South Carolina and Texas.

The wingspan is about 22 mm.

The larvae feed on Verbesina encelioides.

External links
Images
Bug Guide

Schinia
Moths of North America
Moths described in 1876